This is a list of notable automobile manufacturers with articles on Wikipedia by country. It is a subset of the list of automobile manufacturers for manufacturers based in Asian countries. It includes companies that are in business as well as defunct manufacturers.

Bangladesh 

Aftab Automobiles
BMTF
Jamuna Automobiles
Niloy-Hero Motors (joint venture between Hero MotoCorp and Niloy Motors)
PHP Automobiles
Runner Automobiles
Walton Hi-Tech Industries Limited

China

BAIC
Brilliance
BYD
Byton
Changan
Chery
Dongfeng
FAW
Geely
Great Wall
Hafei
JAC
Lifan
Qoros
SAIC
Soueast
Zotye
ZX

India

Force
Mahindra & Mahindra
Tata
Ashok Leyland
Maruti Suzuki
Eicher Motors Limited
Hero Motors
TVS
OLA
Bajaj
BharatBenz
Royal Enfield
Hindustan Motors

Indonesia 

 Esemka
 Pindad

Iran 

Bahman Group
Diar
Fath
Iran Khodro
Khodro Kaveer
MVM
Morattab
SAIPA
Zagross Khodro
Farda Motors

Israel
Tomcar
Zibar

Japan

Acura
Daihatsu
Datsun
Honda
Hino Motors
Infiniti
Isuzu
Lexus
Mazda
Mitsubishi
Mitsuoka Motors
Nissan
Subaru
Suzuki
Toyota
UD Trucks

Lebanon 
W Motors Founded in Lebanon, later moved to the UAE.

Malaysia

Bufori
Inokom
Naza
Perodua
Proton
Tan Chong 
TD2000

North Korea

Pyeonghwa
Sungri

Pakistan

United Motors

Philippines
Almazora Motors
Delta Motors Corporation
Del Monte Motors
DMG Inc.
Francisco Motors Corporation
Sarao Motors

South Korea
CT&T
Hyundai
Kia
Renault Samsung
Ssangyong

Sri Lanka
Micro
Vega Innovations

Syria
Syrian-Iranian Automobile Manufacturing Company (SIAMCO)

Taiwan
CMC
Luxgen

Thailand 
 Thai Rung
 Thai Motor Corporation (THAMCO)
 Mine Mobility

United Arab Emirates 
 W Motors - Founded in Lebanon before moving to Dubai
 Zarooq Motors

Vietnam 
 Mekong Auto
 SAMCO
 THACO
 Vinaxuki
 VinFast
 World Auto

See also
List of automobile manufacturers
List of automobile marques

Lists of automobile manufacturers
Cars